Upper Denford is a hamlet in Berkshire, England, and part of the civil parish of Kintbury.

Hamlets in Berkshire
Kintbury